Matthew McQueen is an American politician and attorney, currently serving as a member of the New Mexico House of Representatives from the 50th district, which covers a portion of Torrance County.

Early life and education 
McQueen was born in 1957 in Pasadena, California. He earned a Bachelor of Arts from Williams College, a Juris Doctor from the University of Michigan Law School, an MBA from the University of New Mexico, and a Master of Science from the University of Michigan School for Environment and Sustainability.

Career 
After law school, McQueen worked as a law clerk on the New Mexico Court of Appeals. Prior to entering politics, McQueen worked as an attorney in the New Mexico Office of the State Engineer. McQueen also operates his own law firm, Graeser & McQueen, LLC in Santa Fe, New Mexico. McQueen assumed office on January 20, 2015 after defeating incumbent Democrat Jarratt Applewhite.

In January 2020, McQueen submitted a bill that would require sex offenders registered in another state to be automatically registered as sex offenders in New Mexico within 20 days of their arrival in the state.

References 

1957 births
Living people
Democratic Party members of the New Mexico House of Representatives
Williams College alumni
University of Michigan Law School alumni
University of Michigan School of Natural Resources and Environment alumni
University of New Mexico alumni
People from Santa Fe County, New Mexico
21st-century American politicians